Babes on Swing Street is a 1944 musical comedy film directed by Edward C. Lilley and starring Ann Blyth, Peggy Ryan, and Andy Devine. It was produced by Universal Pictures.

Plot
Barber's daughter Trudy Costello gives close shaves at her dad Joe's barber shop. She has other skills as well, so becomes excited when classmate Carol Curtis informs her that talent scouts are coming to town to audition young performers.

The kids decide to open a nightclub of their own, needing a place and the money to pay for it. Carol's wealthy aunt Martha wants no part of it, but amiable uncle Malcolm is willing to put up the fee. Malcolm is insure if he can get his hands on his inheritance yet, so he fools Martha into believing that a hall they own is being used for artistic purposes.

Rehearsals go smoothly until Carol's old rival Fern Wallace turns up and vies with her for the same boy's attention. Eventually, however, the show goes on, with Malcolm getting his money and Martha giving her reluctant blessing.

Cast
 Ann Blyth as Carol Curtis
 Peggy Ryan as Trudy Costello
 Andy Devine as Joe Costello
 Leon Errol as Malcolm
 Alma Kruger as Martha
 June Preisser as Fern
 Kirby Grant as Dick
 Anne Gwynne as Frances

See also
List of American films of 1944

References

External links 
 

1944 films
1944 musical comedy films
American musical comedy films
Universal Pictures films
American black-and-white films
Films directed by Edward C. Lilley
1940s American films